Don't Swallow My Heart, Alligator Girl! is a 2017 Brazilian drama film directed by Felipe Bragança. It was screened in the World Cinema Dramatic Competition section of the 2017 Sundance Film Festival.

Cast
 Cauã Reymond as Fernando
 Mario Verón as Alberto
 Leopoldo Pacheco as César
 Adeli Benitez as Basano

References

External links
 

2017 films
2017 drama films
Brazilian drama films
2010s Portuguese-language films